The following people were born in, residents of, or are otherwise closely connected to the city of Thunder Bay, Ontario

Activists 
 Clifford Chadderton (1919–2013), World War II veteran and advocate for veterans; chief executive officer of The War Amps
 Rod Michano (born Toussaint Roderick Michano) (1964–), First Nations public speaker and educator, HIV/AIDS and LGBT activist

Arts

Artists 
Keith Cole, performance artist
Mary Riter Hamilton (1873–1954), painter
Norval Morrisseau, also known as Copper Thunderbird (1932–2007), Ojibway artist

Film and television 
 Marie Avgeropoulos (1986–), actress best known for roles in the films Hunt to Kill, starring Steve Austin; and 50/50, starring Seth Rogan and Joseph Gordon-Levitt; and the CW show The 100; has also had small roles in hit television shows like Fringe and 90210
 Richard Bocking (1931–2012), film producer and director
 Aurora Browne, actress and comedian, co-star in the CTV/Comedy Network production Comedy Inc
 Nanci Chambers (1963–), actress, best known for role as Lieutenant Loren Singer on the CBS television series JAG
 Kevin Durand (1974–), actor, best known for television roles as Joshua on the Fox series Dark Angel, Martin Keamy on the ABC series Lost, and films X-Men Origins: Wolverine and Devil's Knot
 Jeff Geddis (1975–), actor, best known for roles in Sophie and The Latest Buzz
 Michelle Latimer, actress, best known for role as Trish Simpkin in the Showcase soap opera Paradise Falls
 Dorothea Mitchell (1877–1976), lumberjack and co-founder of the Port Arthur Amateur Film Society; first single woman in Ontario to be granted homestead rights
 Trent Opaloch, film cinematographer, best known for his work with Neill Blomkamp and the Russo brothers

Musicians 

 Dave Azzolini, songwriter for Toronto-based pop-rock band The Golden Dogs
 Sydney Blu, music producer and DJ
 Lauri Conger, keyboardist and songwriter for Parachute Club
 Bobby Curtola (1944–2016), early rock and roll singer and one-time teen idol
 Gaye Delorme (1947–2011), songwriter and guitarist
 Jaida Dreyer, country music singer-songwriter
 Natasha Fisher, singer-songwriter
 Don Grashey (1925–2005), songwriter and record producer
 Jessica Grassia, keyboardist, vocalist, and percussionist for Toronto-based pop-rock band The Golden Dogs
 Coleman Hell, singer, songwriter, dance producer 
 Zadeoh, underground rapper, most known for his breakout track "6IXTEEN" that was co-signed by Iayze. 
 Gary Kendall, bassist for Downchild Blues Band
 Hugh Le Caine (1914–1977), physicist, composer, inventor; built the Electronic Sackbut, one of the first synthesizers
 Daniel MacMaster (1968–2008), singer for the Canadian/British hard rock band Bonham
 Paul Shaffer (1949–), musician, actor, and comedian, best known as the bandleader on the Late Show with David Letterman
 Derek Sharp (1965–), rock singer, and guitarist; current lead singer of The Guess Who
 Ian Tamblyn, Juno Award-winning folk singer-songwriter, record producer and playwright

Writers 
 Michael Christie, short story writer and Scotiabank Giller Prize nominee
 Shane Peacock (1957–), writer of books for young adults
 John Potestio (born in Grimaldi, Italy) (1939–), teacher and writer
 Diane Schoemperlen (1954–), poet, novelist and short story writer
 Duncan Weller (1975–), children's book writer and illustrator who won the 2007 Governor General's Award for Children's Literature – Illustration for his book The Boy from the Sun

Business 

 Derek Burney (1939–), civil servant, businessman and former diplomat
 Mel Pervais, Ojibwe, entrepreneur, energy industry executive
 Michael Rapino, CEO and President of Live Nation Entertainment
 James Whalen (1869–1929), businessman and entrepreneur with interests in forestry, shipbuilding, dredging, and towing

Educators 

 Bruce Muirhead, historian and academic whose work focuses on Canada's foreign trade policy
 Penny Petrone (1925–2005), writer, educator, patron of the arts, and philanthropist
 Roy Piovesana (1942–), teacher and historian
 Gary Polonsky (1942–), educator, founding President and Vice-Chancellor of the University of Ontario Institute of Technology

Journalists 

 Maurice Russell Brown (1912–2008), mining journalist
 Robin Philpot (1948–), journalist, Quebec nationalist
 Lorne Saxberg (1958–2006), broadcast journalist, news anchor on CBC Newsworld and NHK

Law 

 Bora Laskin (1912–1984), jurist, former Chief Justice of the Supreme Court of Canada
 Arthur Mauro (1927–), lawyer, businessman

Military 

 Colonel Robert "Bob" Angus Keane  (1914-1977), Canadian Army officer, Commanded The Lake Superior Regiment (Motor) during the Second World War and later commanded the 2nd Battalion, The Royal Canadian Regiment during the Korean War.
 Elizabeth Lawrie Smellie (1884–1968), nurse, first woman to be promoted to the rank of colonel in the Canadian Army

Politics 

 Bob Andras (1921–1982), Liberal Member of Parliament for Port Arthur and Thunder Bay–Nipigon
 Iain Angus (1947–), Canadian politician, Thunder Bay City Councillor
 Hubert Badanai (born in Azzano Decimo, Italy) (1895–1986), automobile dealer and politician
 Ken Boshcoff (1949–), former mayor, Liberal Member of Parliament for Thunder Bay—Rainy River
 Joe Comuzzi (1933–), Conservative Member of Parliament for Thunder Bay—Superior North
 James Conmee (born in Sydenham Township, Canada West) (1848–1913), businessman, politician
 Donald James Cowan (born in Drumbo, Blenheim Township, Oxford County, Ontario) (1883–1964), mayor of Port Arthur, 1916–1917; Crown attorney for Thunder Bay District, Ontario
 Charles Winnans Cox (born in Westminster Township, Middlesex County, Ontario) (1882–1958), longest-serving mayor of Port Arthur, 1934–1948 and 1952
 Simon James Dawson (born in Redhaven, Banffshire, Scotland) (1820–1902), surveyor, civil engineer, politician
 Stan Dromisky (1931–), retired MP
 Ernie Epp (born in Winnipeg, Manitoba) (1941–), historian, former politician
 Doug Fisher (1919–2009), political columnist and politician
 Jim Foulds (1937–), former New Democratic Party MPP for Port Arthur
 Clarence Decatur Howe (born in Waltham, Massachusetts, United States) (1886–1960), politician, "Minister of Everything"
 Saul Laskin (1918–2008), first mayor of Thunder Bay and only Jewish mayor elected at the Lakehead; brother to Bora Laskin
 Robert James Manion (born in Pembroke, Ontario) (1881–1943), politician, leader of the Conservative Party 1938–1940
 Steve Mantis (born in Reading, Pennsylvania) (1950-), politician and former National Coordinator of the Canadian Injured Worker Alliance
 Jack Masters (1931–), former mayor of Thunder Bay and MP for Thunder Bay–Nipigon
 Lyn McLeod (1942–), Ontario politician, former leader of the Ontario Liberal Party
 Paul McRae (born in Toronto) (1924–1992), Liberal MP for Fort William
 Bev Oda (1944–), Conservative Member of Parliament for Durham, Ontario; Japanese Canadian
 Kevin Page (1957–), Canada's first Parliamentary Budget Officer
 George Wardrope (1899–1980), Progressive Conservative MPP for Port Arthur

Scientists 

Sanford Jackson (1909–2000), biochemist, inventor of the bilirubinometer
 Elsie MacGill (1905–1980), aeronautical engineer, the "Queen of the Hurricanes"
 David Pall (1914–2004), chemist, inventor of the Pall filter used in blood transfusions

Sports

Baseball 

 Jeff Heath (1915–1975), left fielder for the Cleveland Indians, St Louis Browns, and Boston Braves

Curling 

 Al Hackner (1954–), curler
 Heather Houston (1958–), curler
 Krista McCarville (1982–), curler
 Lorraine Lang (1956–), curler, currently plays the alternate for Krista McCarville.
 Rick Lang (1953–), curler, currently serves as a performance consultant for Curling Canada.
 Sarah Potts (1989–), curler, currently plays lead for Krista McCarville.
 Frank Sargent (1902–1988), inductee into the Canadian Curling Hall of Fame and former president of the Dominion Curling Association

Ice hockey
 Jack Adams (1895–1968), hockey player; coach and general manager of the Detroit Red Wings
 Jeremy Adduono (1978–), left winger, Iserlohn Roosters (DEL)
 Alex Auld (1981–), goaltender, Ottawa Senators (NHL)
 Pete Backor (1919–1988), defenceman for the Toronto Maple Leafs (NHL), 1944–1945
 Peter Bakovic (1965–), retired left winger in the late 1980s for the Vancouver Canucks (NHL)
 Steve Black (1927–2008), retired hockey player
 Mackenzie Blackwood (1996–), goaltender for the New Jersey Devils (NHL)
 Bob Bodak (1961–), retired ice hockey player for the Calgary Flames and Hartford Whalers (NHL), 1987–1990
 Gus Bodnar (1923–2005), centre for Toronto Maple Leafs and other NHL teams, winner of the Calder Trophy
 Brooke Boquist (1996–), ice hockey player
 Robert Bortuzzo (1989–), defenseman for the St. Louis Blues
 Danny Bois (1983–), winger for the Ottawa Senators (NHL)
 David Bruce (1964–), retired ice hockey player for various teams in the NHL
 Mike Busniuk (1951–), retired ice hockey player for the Philadelphia Flyers
 Larry Cahan, NHL player
 Taylor Chorney (1987–), defenceman for North Dakota Fighting Sioux (WCHA), prospect of the Edmonton Oilers
 Tom Cook (1907–1961), retired forward for Montreal Maroons and Chicago Blackhawks
 Alex Delvecchio (1931–), former centre and left winger for Detroit Red Wings and member of the Hockey Hall of Fame
 Lee Fogolin (1955–), retired NHL defenceman
 Lee Fogolin, Sr. (1927–2000), retired ice hockey player for Detroit Red Wings and Chicago Black Hawks
 Bruce Gamble (1938–1982), former professional ice hockey goaltender, Toronto Maple Leafs
 Dave Gatherum (1932–), former professional ice hockey goaltender, briefly with the Detroit Red Wings
 Pete Goegan (1934–), retired NHL player
 Bill "Goldie" Goldthorpe (1953–), retired career minor leaguer, the inspiration for the character Ogie Ogilthorpe in the film Slap Shot
 Smokey Harris (1890–1974), ice hockey forward, started his career with the Vancouver Millionaires
 Jeff Heerema (1980–), professional ice hockey winger for the Carolina Hurricanes and the St. Louis Blues in the NHL and with the Binghamton Senators (AHL)
 Bill Houlder (1967–), retired professional ice hockey defenceman
Carter Hutton (1985–), goaltender for the Buffalo Sabres
 Tony Hrkac (1966–), retired professional ice hockey centre
Haley Irwin (1988–), women's ice hockey player for the Calgary Inferno, and Olympic gold medalist in 2010 and 2014
 Jason Jaspers (1981–), professional ice hockey centre for Kölner Haie (DEL)
 Trevor Johansen (1957–), retired ice hockey player for various teams in the NHL
 Greg Johnson (1971–2019), retired NHL centre, notably the Detroit Red Wings
 Ryan Johnson (1976–), ice hockey player, St. Louis Blues (NHL)
 Scott King (1967–), goaltender for the Detroit Red Wings (NHL)
 Edgar Laprade (born in Mine Centre, Ontario) (1919–2014) centre for the New York Rangers 1945-1955, winner of Calder Trophy (1945-46) and Lady Byng Trophy (1949-50); played in NHL All-Star Game 1947, 1948, 1949, 1950; member of Hockey Hall of Fame. 
 David Latta (1976–), left winger for Quebec Nordiques (NHL)
 Trevor Letowski (1977–), retired right winger, Carolina Hurricanes (NHL); head coach Windsor Spitfires (OHL)
 Danny Lewicki (1931–), retired ice hockey forward
 Pentti Lund (born in Karijoki, Finland) (1925–), retired ice hockey player, began his career with the Port Arthur Bruins
 Norm Maciver (1964–), retired ice hockey player, scored the final goal in Winnipeg Jets history
 Calum MacKay (1927–2001), former ice hockey player, notably of the Montreal Canadiens
 Connie Madigan (1958–1976), retired professional defenceman; oldest rookie in National Hockey League history
 Jimmy McLeod (1937–), retired ice hockey player for the NHL and WHA
Matt Murray (1994–), goaltender for the Toronto Maple Leafs
 Fred Page (1915–1997), Hockey Hall of Fame inductee, former president of the Canadian Amateur Hockey Association
 Steve Passmore (1973–), professional ice hockey goaltender for HCJ Milano Vipers, Italian Serie A
 Walt Poddubny (1960–2009), former professional ice hockey left winger
 Chris Porter (1984–), former NHL left winger, currently playing for Providence Bruins
 Sean Pronger (1972–), ice hockey player
 Nelson Pyatt (1953–), retired ice hockey player
 Taylor Pyatt (1981–), retired ice hockey player for the NHL
 Tom Pyatt (1987–), centre for the Vancouver Canucks (NHL)
 Steve Rucchin (1971–), retired NHL centre, notably for Anaheim Ducks (NHL)
 Charlie Sands (1911–?), professional ice hockey right winger
 Frank Sargent (1902–1988), former president of the Canadian Amateur Hockey Association
Patrick Sharp (1981–), left wing, Chicago Blackhawks (NHL)
 Dave Siciliano (1946–), ice hockey coach for the Thunder Bay Flyers and inductee into the Northwestern Ontario Sports Hall of Fame
Eric Staal (1984–), centre, Florida Panthers (NHL)
Jared Staal (1990–), retired NHL player
Jordan Staal (1988–), centre, Carolina Hurricanes (NHL)
Marc Staal (1987–), defenceman for the Florida Panthers (NHL)
 Vern Stenlund 
Ralph Stewart (1948–), retired NHL defenceman for the Vancouver Canucks
Ron Talakoski (1962–2009), retired ice hockey player for the New York Rangers (NHL)
Mike Tomlak (1965–), retired ice hockey centre
Vic Venasky (1951–), retired ice hockey player for the Los Angeles Kings (NHL)
Gary Veneruzzo (1943–), retired NHL player
Jimmy Ward (1906–1990), former NHL right winger
Katie Weatherston (1983–), Olympian women's ice hockey player and Olympic gold medallist

Skiing 

Steve Collins (1964–), retired ski jumper, the youngest person ever to have won a Ski jumping World Cup event
Dave Irwin (1954–), two-time Olympic downhill skier

Wrestling 

Melissa Coates (1969-2021), professional wrestler and fitness model
Paul Diamond (born Tom Boric) (1961–), retired professional wrestler and soccer player, best known being one half of the tag-team "Badd Company"
Vampiro (born Ian Richard Hodgkinson) (1967–), professional wrestler

Other 

Richard Xavier Baxter (1821–1904), Jesuit priest, known as ‘the Apostle of the Railway Builders’
Gordy Ceresino (1957–), retired football linebacker for the San Francisco 49ers
Mary DePiero (1968–), diver
Curt Harnett (1965–), retired Olympic cyclist
Dan Ladouceur (1973–), retired lacrosse defenceman for the Toronto Rock (NLL)
Jay Miron (1970–), professional BMX rider, has competed in every X-Games competition since 1995
Liam Parsons (1977–), retired rower; bronze medallist at the Beijing 2008 Summer Olympics
Bryan Rosenfeld (1965–), retired association football player
Trevor Stewardson (1977–), light heavyweight boxer; competed for Canada at the 2004 Summer Olympics

Miscellaneous 
Barbara Kentner, murdered in 2017
Viljo Rosvall and Janne Voutilainen, unionists and martyrs; mysteriously disappeared on November 18, 1929

References 

Thunder Bay
Thunder Bay